"Xxplosive" is a song by Dr. Dre from his album 2001.  It features Kurupt, Hittman, and Six-Two on the verses and Nate Dogg singing the chorus.  The track is based upon the song "Bumpy's Lament" by Soul Mann & the Brothers.  The original title was "The Way I Be Pimpin" which featured Royce da 5'9" on the chorus and Dre rapping the verses.

Charts
Along with a lot of songs from the 2001 album, the song charted on the Hot R&B/Hip-Hop Songs due to radio play after the album was released.  It reached No. 51.

Certifications

Samples
The track is based upon the song "Bumpy's Lament” by Soul Mann & the Brothers, which was originally written and recorded by Isaac Hayes for his groundbreaking Shaft soundtrack to the 1971 movie of the same name. The song has been sampled by Erykah Badu for a remix of her song “Bag Lady”, Solange Knowles for her cover of "Stillness Is The Move" by the Dirty Projectors, as well as by Lil Wayne for his song "Dope Niggaz" featuring Snoop Dogg, from his acclaimed album Tha Carter V.

References

1999 songs
Dr. Dre songs
Nate Dogg songs
Gangsta rap songs
Songs written by Nate Dogg
Songs written by Kurupt
Songs written by Dr. Dre
G-funk songs